is a Japanese actress best known for her role as Okichi opposite John Wayne in The Barbarian and the Geisha in 1958.

Ando was born in Harbin, Heilongjiang, in the Japanese puppet state of Manchukuo (today Northeast China), to a Japanese industrialist. When the Communists took over the family fled back to Japan. After her father died in 1953, she went to work as a singer and then as a burlesque dancer. When director John Huston was looking for an actress for the part of Okichi, a friend of Ando's who worked in the Tokyo office of 20th Century-Fox recommended Ando to Huston. Once Huston saw her, after auditioning 33 other actresses, he and producer Eugene Frenke were done looking, mainly because of her height over the other women.

References

External links

Japanese film actresses
1934 births
Living people
Japanese women singers
Burlesque performers
Actresses from Harbin
Japanese female dancers
Japanese people from Manchukuo
Japanese expatriates in China